The 1983 Delaware Fightin' Blue Hens football team represented the University of Delaware as an independent during the 1983 NCAA Division I-AA football season. Led by 18th-year head coach Tubby Raymond, the Fightin' Blue Hens compiled a record of 4–7. The team played home games at Delaware Stadium in Newark, Delaware.

Schedule

References

Delaware
Delaware Fightin' Blue Hens football seasons
Delaware Fightin' Blue Hens football